Chao Mom Kham Lue, Chinese name Dao Shixun (September 1928 – October 1, 2017) was the last native chief of Sipsongpanna, and a professor of linguistics. He was born Jinghong. He was the 28th Chao Phaen Din.

Publications
Parlons lü: la langue taï des "douze mille rizières" du Yunnan 
History of the Zhaopanlings of Jinghong
The influence of the Pali language of Dai

References

Linguists from China
1928 births
2017 deaths
People from Xishuangbanna
Republic of China politicians from Yunnan
People's Republic of China politicians from Yunnan
People's Republic of China historians
Historians from Yunnan
Educators from Yunnan
Victims of the Cultural Revolution